Antepirrhoe is a genus of moths in the family Geometridae described by Warren in 1905.

Species
 Antepirrhoe atrifasciata (Hulst, 1888)
 Antepirrhoe fasciata (Barnes & McDunnough, 1918)
 Antepirrhoe semiatrata (Hulst, 1881)

References

Cidariini
Geometridae genera